Brevis is the Latin word for short, and may refer to:

 Brevis (note), a musical note in mensural notation, see Mensural notation
 Brevis (moth)
 Brevis (syllable), a light syllable in Ancient Greek and Latin poetry
 Brevis in longo, a short syllable in place of a long syllable
 Toyota Brevis, a mid-sized luxury sedan
 Brevis, a French surname

See also
Brevis muscle (disambiguation), several muscles in the human body
Ars longa, vita brevis ("art is long, life is short"), part of an aphorism by Ancient Greek physician Hippocrates
Exposito en Brevis in Lucam ("A Brief Commentary on Luke"), a work by the ninth-century Benedictine monk Christian of Stavelot
Missa brevis, a "short Mass", referring to the Christian liturgy
Vita Brevis ("Brief Life"), a book written by Jostein Gaarder, published in 1996
Brevi, an Italian surname